Tyrell Johannes Chicco Malacia (born 17 August 1999) is a Dutch professional footballer who plays as a left-back for Premier League club Manchester United and the Netherlands national team.

Malacia joined Feyenoord's youth system at the age of nine. He made his professional debut for the club in December 2017, and won the KNVB Cup in 2018. He was named in the UEFA Europa Conference League Team of the Season in 2022, after earning a runners-up medal in the competition. Later that year, he joined Manchester United.

Malacia was a youth international for the Netherlands from under-16 to under-21 level, before making his senior international debut against Montenegro in September 2021.

Club career

Feyenoord

Malacia was born in Rotterdam, and joined the Feyenoord youth academy at the age of nine in 2008. He signed his first professional contract with them on 2 December 2015. He made his professional debut for Feyenoord in a 2–1 UEFA Champions League win against Napoli on 6 December 2017, wherein he played the full 90 minutes. Malacia made his Eredivisie debut for Feyenoord in a 1–1 tie with SC Heerenveen on 13 December 2017. He was an unused substitute in the 2018 KNVB Cup Final, where Feyenoord beat AZ Alkmaar 3–0. On 25 May 2022, he started in Feyenoord's 1–0 UEFA Europa Conference League Final loss against Roma in Albania. He was later one of five Feyenoord players named in the competition's Team of the Season.

Manchester United
On 5 July 2022, Malacia signed a four-year contract with Premier League club Manchester United, with the option of a further year. United paid Feyenoord an initial fee of €15 million (£13 million), with an extra €2 million (£1.7 million) in add-ons, to make Malacia the club's first signing under manager Erik ten Hag. Two days later, it was confirmed that he would wear the number 12 shirt last worn by Chris Smalling. On 7 August, Malacia made his club debut as a substitute in a 2–1 home loss against Brighton & Hove Albion in the Premier League. On 22 August 2022, Malacia started for the first time for United in a 2–1 win against Liverpool. On 26 February 2023, he featured in the United squad to win the Carabao Cup 2-0 against Newcastle United, his first trophy with the club.

International career
Malacia was born in the Netherlands, to a Curaçaoan father and Surinamese mother. Malacia was a youth international who represented the Netherlands at under-16, under-17, under-18, under-20 and under-21 levels. He was called up to the preliminary squad for the Curaçao national team for the 2021 CONCACAF Gold Cup. On 27 August 2021, Malacia received his first call-up for the Netherlands national football team for the 2022 FIFA World Cup qualification matches against Norway, Montenegro and Turkey. He made his debut on 4 September 2021 in the match against Montenegro.

Career statistics

Club

International

Honours
Feyenoord
KNVB Cup: 2017–18
Johan Cruyff Shield: 2018
UEFA Europa Conference League runner-up: 2021–22

Manchester United
EFL Cup: 2022–23

Individual
UEFA Europa Conference League Team of the Season: 2021–22
Eredivisie Talent of the Month: April 2019

References

External links

Profile at the Manchester United website
Profile at the Royal Dutch Football Association website (in Dutch)

1999 births
Living people
Footballers from Rotterdam
Dutch footballers
Association football defenders
Feyenoord players
Manchester United F.C. players
Eredivisie players
Premier League players
2022 FIFA World Cup players
Netherlands youth international footballers
Netherlands under-21 international footballers
Netherlands international footballers
Dutch expatriate footballers
Expatriate footballers in England
Dutch expatriate sportspeople in England
Dutch people of Curaçao descent
Dutch sportspeople of Surinamese descent